Miloš Božanović (Serbian Cyrillic: Милош Божановић; 10 March 1863 – 14 January 1922) was a Serbian military commander and Minister of Defence.

He served during the Serbo-Bulgarian War, the Balkan Wars and during the Serbian Campaign (part of the larger Balkans Campaign) during World War I.

Career
Božanović was the Minister of Defence of the Kingdom of Serbia from 3 January 1913 to 4 January 1914. At his own request, he retired from all duties on 1 November 1917.

Death
While hunting, he contracted a cold which ended up in pneumonia from which he died on 14 January 1922 in Belgrade, just one day after the death of Serbian general Pavle Jurišić Šturm.

References

External links

1863 births
1922 deaths
People from Drenovci
Serbs of Croatia
19th-century Serbian people
20th-century Serbian people
Immigrants to the Principality of Serbia
Serbian soldiers
Serbian generals
Royal Serbian Army soldiers
Government ministers of Serbia
People of the Serbo-Bulgarian War
Serbian military personnel of the Balkan Wars
Serbian military personnel of World War I
Deaths from pneumonia in Yugoslavia
Defence ministers of Serbia